You Only Live Once is a 1937 American crime drama film directed by Fritz Lang and starring Sylvia Sidney and Henry Fonda. Considered an early film noir, the film was the second directed by Lang in the United States. At least 15 minutes were trimmed from the original 100-minute version of the film due to its then unprecedented violence. Despite the removal of such scenes, the film is widely considered an early film noir classic. The film is also known for being one of the first box-office bombs.

Plot
Eddie Taylor is an ex-convict who feels he is reformed and deserves a break, but he has doubts that he will not get one.  Initially, his doubts seem unfounded as his life goes well; he is married to Joan (the woman who waited for him and who has always believed in him), her boss (Stephen the public defender) has helped him gets a steady job, and he has the wherewithal to buy a house with Joan. 

But this new life starts to all apart, when he is summarily fired after his boss finds out about Eddie's past. Eddie's old gang tempt him with an offer to join them in bank robberies, but he chooses to search for legitimate work instead. When a bank job, occurs during which six people are killed,  Eddie is framed and subsequently wrongly convicted for the murders. He is sentenced to death by electrocution. 

On the eve of his execution date, he escapes from the prison infirmary using a smuggled gun, just as the authorities issue a stay of execution. Eddie's conviction has been called into doubt, as the bank vehicle used in the getaway has been recovered from a lake and found to contain the stolen money and the body of the real murderer and bank robber. The prison chaplain, who Eddie has always trusted, tries to convince him of that the reprieve is real, but Eddie is too bitter and disillusioned to accept he is a free man. He kills the chaplain in his desperation to escape.

He and a now pregnant Joan go on the lam, hoping to make it across the border to Canada. They become infamous and are blamed for every crime in the areas they pass through. After the baby is born, Joan manages to meet Stephen and her sister. The two have arranged for Joan to hop a boat to Havana with the baby and wait there while Stephen works to clear her name. She refuses to leave Eddie. They continue their run, but are ambushed by the police and killed. As he dies, Eddie hears the voice of the chaplain telling him he is free.

Cast

Reception
The film recorded a loss of $48,045.

Legacy

Radio adaptation
You Only Live Once was presented on Philip Morris Playhouse on November 28, 1941. The adaptation starred Burgess Meredith.

Cultural impact
James Baldwin writes fondly about the film in The Devil Finds Work, arguing Lang "never succeeded quite so brilliantly again".

François Truffaut wrote the film "is about destiny and fate", explaining: "You Only Live Once is about interlocking forces: everything may seem to be going well, but the truth is, everything is going badly."

References

External links
 
 
 
 

1937 films
1937 crime drama films
Film noir
Films directed by Fritz Lang
American black-and-white films
1930s English-language films
United Artists films
American crime drama films
Films scored by Alfred Newman
Films produced by Walter Wanger
1930s American films